Bochasan is a village in Anand district, Gujarat, western India. It is known primarily as the origin of Bochasanwasi Shri Akshar Purushottam Swaminarayan Sanstha (BAPS), so named because its first formal center was established in Bochasan in 1907 by its guru Shastriji Maharaj.

References

Swaminarayan Sampradaya
Villages in Anand district